Archichthys is a genus of rhizodont lobe-finned fish that lived during the Carboniferous period. Holotype of this fish was found in Northumberland, UK.

References

External links 
 Fossil specimen: NEWHM NEWHM: G59.64 d – Holotype

Carboniferous bony fish
Prehistoric lobe-finned fish genera
Rhizodonts